Ashwell is a village and civil parish in Hertfordshire situated  north-east of Baldock.

History
To the southwest of the village is Arbury Banks, the remains of an Iron Age hill fort which have been largely removed by agricultural activity.

In 2002 a local metal detector, Alan Meek, found a silver Roman figurine of a goddess, Dea Senuna. A subsequent archaeological dig over four summers revealed 26 more gold and silver objects situated in a major open-air ritual site.

The Buckinghamshire family of Nernewt (Nernuyt) held land here in the 14th century, which was originally part of the Abbot of Westminster's manor. This land became the manor of Westbury Nernewtes.

The village has a wealth of architecture spanning several centuries. There was also a great fire of Ashwell on Saturday 2 February 1850, without fatalities.

The village itself is mostly in a fine state of preservation, from the medieval cottage to the fine town house, plastered or timbered, thatched or tiled, in Tudor, Carolean or Georgian brick. 'Scheduled' listed buildings include the St. John's Guildhall of 1681, the carefully restored Foresters Cottages, the Chantry House with its 15th-century window, the 16th-century town house (now a local museum), the Maltings (now converted into flats), and a small brick house which was first built in 1681 as a school by the Merchant Taylors. Ashwell Bury, a large Victorian house, was remodelled by Edwin Lutyens in the 1920s.  Lutyens also designed the Grade 2 listed Ashwell War Memorial, unveiled in 1922.  Ashwell also has a village lock-up that was used to detain drunks and suspected criminals. The village used to be home to a number of local breweries and, accordingly, a variety of public houses in its past, but currently has just three pubs: The Rose and Crown, the Three Tuns and the Bushel and Strike.

Since 1850 the village has been served by Ashwell and Morden railway station which is about a mile and half from the centre of the village in the hamlet of Odsey in Cambridgeshire.

Church
The church contains medieval graffiti carved on its walls which highlight the plight of survivors of the bubonic plague pandemic known as the Black Death.There is also a graffito depiction of Old St Paul’s Cathedral. 

In 2013, the village church became the centre of a nationally reported row over the quarter-hourly chiming of the clock. Complaints about the chimes during the night were initially received in the summer of that year, which North Hertfordshire District Council (NHDC) was legally obliged to investigate. In December, the council ruled that the chimes are "prejudicial to health" and have to be silenced between 11 pm and 6 am. Complying with the ruling has meant turning off the chimes altogether, although the parish council has asked the Diocese of St Albans if it can install a timing mechanism that will restrict the chimes to the legally appointed hours, and has launched an appeal to raise the £1,900 cost. The chiming clock was initially installed in 1898, but was turned off for 18 months in 2011 and 2012 while repairs were carried out. A public meeting on 19 January 2014 discussed the future of the chimes. In May 2015, a timer had been installed to reduce the volume of the church bells overnight.

Geography
Ashwell Springs, a biological Site of Special Scientific Interest, is a perennial source of the River Cam. The cool water of the chalk springs contain a rare species of stenothermic flatworm (Platyhelminthes; Tricladida) associated with cold surface waters or subterranean groundwater that is only known from this location within East Anglia. The springs now depend upon artificial flow augmentation during drier periods, due to the impact of local groundwater abstraction from the chalk aquifer for public water supply.

The village is a "green oasis" with many trees and this contrasts with the surrounding landscape dominated by intense agricultural production, principally of wheat, with rather limited aesthetic or biodiversity interest.

Governance
Ashwell has three tiers of local government at parish, district and county level: Ashwell Parish Council, North Hertfordshire District Council, and Hertfordshire County Council.

Ashwell is an ancient parish, and it was part of the hundred of Odsey. Ashwell was included in the Royston Poor Law Union from 1835. The Local Government Act 1894 created parish and district councils. The parish of Ashwell was included in Ashwell Rural District from 28 December 1894, and Ashwell Parish Council came into being on 31 December 1894, taking over the secular functions of the parish vestry. Despite the name, Ashwell Rural District Council was based in the town of Royston rather than in Ashwell itself. Ashwell Rural District was abolished in 1935, becoming part of Hitchin Rural District, which in turn was abolished in 1974, becoming part of North Hertfordshire.

Sport
Ashwell has several successful sports teams from under-12s to veterans. The adult first football team have won several trophies and are currently in the Hall's of Cambridge Sunday league premier division. The cricket team won the Cambridgeshire Junior Cup in 2003 and currently play in Division 1 of the Cambridgeshire league.  There are many other clubs and societies catering for all interests. Ashwell have a junior soccer side called the Academicals, which are from age 5 to 18.

Notable residents
Erasmus Darwin Barlow, psychiatrist, businessman and great-grandson of naturalist Charles Darwin, was a long-time resident of the village.
William Bill, Vice-Chancellor of the University of Cambridge (1548) and Dean of Westminster (1560–1561), was born in the village
Colin Blumenau, actor, lived in the village
Jack Blumenau, actor, lived in the village
Peter Boston, architect and illustrator, died in the village
Mike Bushell, BBC sports presenter, lived in the village
Thomas Cawton, English clergyman, studied theology in the village
Edric Cundell, English composer and conductor (at Bear House, High Street)
William Dakins, English academic and clergyman, believed to have been born in the village
 Kiki Dee, singer best known for her 1976 duet with Elton John entitled Don't Go Breaking My Heart
Cathie Felstead, illustrator, lives in the village
George Joye, 16th-century Bible translator, lived in the village
Paul Maltby, Air Vice-Marshal, lived in the village
Herbert Palmer, English Puritan clergyman, member of the Westminster Assembly, and President of Queens' College, Cambridge, lived in the village
Jonathan E. Sheppard, Hall of Fame trainer in American Thoroughbred horse racing, was born in the village

Gallery

References

External links

Ashwell village website
Ashwell's Parish Church website
Seven Springs – Megalithic Portal
Ashwell (A Guide to Old Hertfordshire)
 

 
Villages in Hertfordshire
Civil parishes in Hertfordshire
Roman sites in Hertfordshire
North Hertfordshire District